Jackson Public Schools (JPS) is a school district headquartered in Jackson, Michigan.

Superintendent
On February 6, 2014, Jackson High graduate Jeffrey Beal was chosen unanimously to become the next Jackson Public Schools superintendent effective June 30, 2014. He will succeed former Superintendent Dan Evans who has been JPS’ superintendent since 1999.

Schools
Secondary schools
Jackson High School
T. A. Wilson Academy (formerly Tomlinson Education Center)
Middle School at Parkside
Primary schools
Bennett Elementary School
Cascades Elementary School
Dibble Elementary School
Frost Elementary School
Hunt Elementary School
JPS Montessori Center
McCulloch Academy of Science and Technology (closed)
Northeast Elementary School
Sharp Park Academy (formerly Sharp Park Middle School and Sharp Park Elementary School)

References

External links

 

Jackson, Michigan
School districts in Michigan
Education in Jackson County, Michigan